The Slovak Society of Actuaries (SSA) is the association of actuaries in Slovakia. The Society was established in 1996. It is a full member of the International Actuarial Association and the Groupe Consultatif. As of 2011, the Society has about 150 members, 25 of them fully qualified. Current chairman of the Society is Milada Jantošová.

History

The Slovak Society of Actuaries was established in 1996. It aims to develop actuarial science in Slovakia and to promote actuaries within the local financial market.

The Society represents Slovak actuaries in international actuarial bodies. In 2005, it became a full member of the International Actuarial Association and also a full member of the Groupe Consultatif.

Past chairmen

 2001-2006 Mária Bilíková
 2006-2010 Jelica Kľúčovská
 Since 2010 Milada Jantošová

External links

 Slovak Society of Actuaries official website

Actuarial associations